Enfield Graded School, also known as Enfield Middle School, is a historic school building located at Enfield, Halifax County, North Carolina. It was designed by architect Frank B. Simpson and built in 1950.  It is a two-story, Colonial Revival style brick building. The "H"-shaped building consists of a large two-story central block, projecting two-story flanking wings, a one-story auditorium, and a one-story kitchen addition. Also on the property are the contributing brick gymnasium (1951), concrete block agricultural building (1952), and adjacent athletic fields.

It was listed on the National Register of Historic Places in 2009.

References

School buildings on the National Register of Historic Places in North Carolina
Colonial Revival architecture in North Carolina
School buildings completed in 1950
Schools in Halifax County, North Carolina
National Register of Historic Places in Halifax County, North Carolina
1950 establishments in North Carolina